Hans Koschnick (2 April 1929 – 21 April 2016) was a German politician (SPD) and elder statesman. He was the President of the Senate and Mayor of Bremen from 1967 to 1985, the President of the Bundesrat in 1970/71 and 1981/82, and afterwards served as a member of the Bundestag, the German federal parliament, from 1987 to 1998. 
Between 1994 and 1996, Koschnick was the EU administrator of Mostar. He died on 21 April 2016, aged 87.

Early years 
Koschnick grew up in the Gröpelingen neighborhood of Bremen. His childhood was shaped by his parents' activism. His father, who was a trade unionist and official of the Revolutionäre Gewerkschafts-Opposition, was arrested on the evening of 1 May 1933, the day before the Nazis stormed union offices all over Germany. He was charged with high treason for having organized a May Day rally and made a speech and was sent to a zuchthaus and then Sachsenhausen concentration camp, before being released "on leave" in 1938. In 1943, he was drafted into military service and the next year, sent to Finland.

His mother was arrested for acting as a courier between several German Resistance groups and spent one year. She refused to join the German Labour Front (DAF) and "learn" the Hitler greeting, causing her to frequently lose her job until she finally secured a position as a sugared goods sales clerk and was relatively removed from DAF spot checks. These interruptions were combined with constant absences, so Koschnick grew up with his grandparents.

References

External links 
 
 AP

1929 births
2016 deaths
Presidents of the German Bundesrat
Members of the Bürgerschaft of Bremen
Members of the Bundestag for Bremen
Members of the Bundestag 1990–1994
Members of the Bundestag for the Social Democratic Party of Germany
Mayors of Bremen
German military personnel of World War II